Ron Dowling (27 June 1913 – 5 March 2005) was an Australian rules footballer who played with Collingwood in the Victorian Football League (VFL).

Dowling, an engineer by profession, played as an amateur during his league career. He was on the wing for Collingwood in both the 1937 and 1938 VFL Grand Finals, which they lost. A suspension cost an appearance in a third successive grand final in 1939, having been found guilty of striking Melbourne player Keith Truscott in the semi final.

Before he died, at the age of 91 in 2005, he was the oldest living Collingwood player.

References

1913 births
Australian rules footballers from Victoria (Australia)
Collingwood Football Club players
Ivanhoe Amateurs Football Club players
2005 deaths